333 Bush Street is a 43-floor,  mixed-use skyscraper located on Bush Street in the Financial District of San Francisco, California. The building was completed in 1986 and was designed by Skidmore, Owings & Merrill and contains commercial offices as well as seven stories of individually owned residential condominiums. It is one of 39 San Francisco high rises reported by the U.S. Geological Survey as potentially vulnerable to a large earthquake, due to a flawed welding technique.

Recent ownership history
In 2009, the tower's owners, Hines and Sterling American Property, forfeited ownership to their lenders after the primary tenant, multinational law firm Heller Ehrman filed for bankruptcy and defaulted on rent payments leaving property 65 percent vacant. In 2013, the building was purchased by a joint venture of Massachusetts Pension Reserves Investment Management Board and DivcoWest Properties for US$275 million. In 2015, the property was acquired by Tishman Speyer for US$380 million.

Tenants
State Compensation Insurance Fund
National Park Service Pacific West Regional Office
Duetto
Littler Mendelson
Lewis Brisbois Bisgaard & Smith
Andersen Tax LLC
Sen. Alex Padilla (Office)
Carta (software company)

See also

 San Francisco's tallest buildings

References

External links

Skyscraper office buildings in San Francisco
Financial District, San Francisco
Residential skyscrapers in San Francisco
Brookfield Properties buildings
Office buildings completed in 1986
Residential buildings completed in 1986
1980s architecture in the United States
Skidmore, Owings & Merrill buildings